Events from the year 1851 in Canada.

Incumbents
Monarch — Victoria

Federal government
Parliament: 3rd

Governors
Governor General of the Province of Canada — James Bruce, 8th Earl of Elgin
Colonial Governor of Newfoundland — Charles Henry Darling
Governor of New Brunswick — Edmund Walker Head
Governor of Nova Scotia — John Harvey
Governor of Prince Edward Island — Dominick Daly

Premiers
Joint Premiers of the Province of Canada —
Francis Hincks, Canada West Premier
Augustin-Norbert Morin, Canada East Premier 
Premier of Nova Scotia — James Boyle Uniacke
Premier of Prince Edward Island — John Holl

Events
April 7 – The first Canadian postage stamps are printed
April 25 – Prince Edward Island wins responsible government
June – Harbor Commissioners deepen Lake St. Peter.
July – The bloomer costume appears in Montreal.
July 31 – Broad Provincial railway gauge is legislated in the Province of Canada, creating a break-of-gauge with American railways.
August 30 – The Vancouver Island legislature meets for the first time
October 11 – The St. L. & A. Railway is opened to Richmond.
 William Kennedy was commander of the second sponsored expedition to find Sir John Franklin

Full date unknown
Gabriel Franchere's Narrative of a Voyage to the Northwest Coast of America published in Montreal.
The United Kingdom transfers control of the colonial postal system to Canada.

Births
April 7 – John Wilson Bengough, political cartoonist (died 1923)
April 8 – Frederick Peters, lawyer, politician and Premier of Prince Edward Island (died 1919)
May 22 – Gilbert Ganong, businessman, politician and Lieutenant Governor of New Brunswick (died 1917)
July 8 – James Dunsmuir, industrialist, politician and Premier of British Columbia (died 1920)
August 26 – Herbert James Palmer, politician and Premier of Prince Edward Island (died 1939)
September 5 – George Frederick Baird, politician and lawyer (died 1899)
November – Levi Addison Ault, businessman and naturalist (died 1930)
November 28 – Albert Grey, 4th Earl Grey, 9th Governor General of Canada (died 1917)
December 10 – James Albert Manning Aikins, politician and Lieutenant-Governor of Manitoba (died 1929)

Deaths

References 

 
Canada
Years of the 19th century in Canada
1851 in North America